Siege of Saint-Jean-d'Angély may refer to:

Siege of Saint-Jean-d'Angély (1351) during the Hundred Years' War
Siege of Saint-Jean-d'Angély (1569)
Siege of Saint-Jean-d'Angély (1621) during the Wars of Religion